Luigi Aloysius Colla (30 April 1766 – 23 December 1848) was an Italian botanist of the late 18th and early 19th Centuries. He was a member of the Provisional Government of Savoy from December 12, 1798, to April 2, 1799, taking his turn as chairman of the government in rotation for a ten-day term. In 1820 Colla described two species, Musa balbisiana and Musa acuminata, that are the basis for almost all cultivated bananas. Colla was a member of the Philadelphia Academy of Natural Sciences.

Bibliography
 L'antolegista botanico - Turin - Volume 1, Volume 5, Volume 6
 Memoria sul genere Musa e monografia del medesimo - Turin
 Observations sur le Limodorum purpureum de M. de Lamarck et création d'un nouveau genre dans la famille des Orchidées - Paris : Imprimerie Lebel
 Hortus Ripulensis seu enumeratio plantarum quae Ripulis coluntur - Ed. Augustae Taurinorum
 Mémoire sur le Melanopsidium Nigrum des jardiniers, et formation d'un genre nouveau dans la famille des rubiacées (1825)
 Illustrationes et icones rariorum stirpium quae in ejus horto Ripulis florebant, anno 1826, addita ad hortum Ripulensem appendice III (1826)
 avec Carlo Giuseppe Bertero - Plantae rariores in regionibus chilensibus - Deux tomes - Ex regia typographia (1832–1833) 
 Herbarium Pedemontanum juxta Methodum Naturalem Dispositum Additis - Ed. Augustae Taurinorum - Tome 1 (1833), Tome 2 (1834), Tome 3 (1834), Tome 4, Tome 6 (1836), Tome 7, Tome 8
 Osservazioni sovra una notizia pubblicata nel Messaggiere del 17 agosto 1842, num. 35 dal sig. Paolo Emilio Colombo circa l'Elephantusia macrocarpa del Willd (1842)
 Observations sur la famille des rutacées : sur le genre Correa et formation du nouveau genre Antommarchia (1843)
 Camelliografia ossia tentavio di una nuova disposizione naturale delle varietà della Camellia del Giappone - Turin

Notes

References
Dictionary of botanic terminology - index of names - retrieved June 6, 2006

19th-century Italian botanists
1766 births
1848 deaths
18th-century Italian botanists